The 2011 Rakuten Japan Open Tennis Championships was a men's tennis tournament played on outdoor hard courts. It was the 38th edition of the event known that year as the Rakuten Japan Open Tennis Championships, and was part of the 500 Series of the 2011 ATP World Tour. It was held at the Ariake Coliseum in Tokyo, Japan, from 3 October through 9 October 2011. Andy Murray won both the singles and doubles titles, the latter with his brother Jamie.

Singles main-draw entrants

Seeds

 Rankings are based on the rankings of September 26, 2011.

Other entrants
The following players received wildcards into the singles main draw:
  Tatsuma Ito
  Go Soeda
  Yūichi Sugita

The following players received entry from the qualifying draw:

  Marco Chiudinelli
  Matthew Ebden
  Ryan Harrison
  Dudi Sela

Finals

Singles

 Andy Murray defeated  Rafael Nadal, 3–6, 6–2, 6–0
It was Murray's 4th title of the year and 20th of his career.

Doubles

 Andy Murray /  Jamie Murray defeated  František Čermák /  Filip Polášek, 6–1, 6–4

References

External links 

 

Rakuten Japan Open Tennis Championships
Japan Open (tennis)
Tennis Championships
Rakuten Japan Open Tennis Championships